Ahsanullah University of Science and Technology, commonly known as AUST, is a private (Science and Technology) University in Bangladesh. It was founded by the Dhaka Ahsania Mission in 1995.

Dhaka Ahsania Mission is a non-profit voluntary organization in Bangladesh. The Mission was established in 1958 by Khan Bahadur Ahsanullah.

Campus
The permanent campus of the university has been built on 5-bighas (1.676 acres) of land at Tejgaon Industrial Area which is located in the heart of Dhaka City.

The land use in this area is quickly changing from an industrial area to a commercial area. The 10-storied building including 2-level basement has a total floor area of more than 4 lac sq.ft. It is the first ever permanent campus built by any private universities in Bangladesh. 

Continuous power and water supply is ensured by its own two generators, each of 1000 KVA, 2500 KVA sub-station and 4-inch diameter deep tube-well.

The campus also provides facilities for co-curricular activities like common rooms (male & female), indoor game rooms, etc. as well as space for car parking and heavy machinery labs in the basements.

Administration
List of vice-chancellors
 M. H. Khan (April 1987 – April 1991)
 M. Anwar Hossain (February 2007 – January 2011) 
 A. M. M. Safiullah (August 2011 – 31 July 2019)
Muhammad Fazli Ilahi (1 January 2020 – Present)

Faculties and departments
The university has the following faculties and departments:

Faculty of Architecture and Planning
 Department of Architecture
Bachelor of Architecture 
Master of Architecture

Faculty of Engineering
 Department of Computer Science and Engineering
Bachelor of Science in Computer Science and Engineering (CSE)
  Department of Electrical & Electronics Engineering
Bachelor of Science in Electrical & Electronics Engineering (EEE)
Master of Science in Electrical & Electronics Engineering (EEE)
 Department of Civil Engineering
Bachelor of Science in Civil Engineering (CE)
Master of Science in Civil Engineering (Civil)
Master of Science in Civil & Environmental Engineering
Post Graduate Diploma (Civil)
 Department of Mechanical & Production Engineering
Bachelor of Science in Mechanical Engineering (ME)
Bachelor of Science in Industrial and Production Engineering (IPE)
 Department of Textile Engineering
Bachelor of Science in Textile Engineering (TE)
 Department of Arts & Science
Master of Science in Mathematics

Faculty of Business and Social Science
 School of Business
Bachelor of Business Administration
Master of Business Administration (Regular)
Master of Business Administration (Executive)

Faculty of Education
 Department of Education
Master of Education (M.Ed.)
Bachelor's degree in Primary Education (B.Ed. Primary)
Bachelor's degree in Non-Formal Education (B.Ed. Non-Formal)

Accreditation
The academic programs of the university are recognized by the following organizations:
 University Grants Commission (Bangladesh) UGC   (University Grants Commission, Bangladesh)
 Institution of Engineers, Bangladesh (IEB)
 Institute of Architects, Bangladesh (IAB)
 Institution of Textile Engineers and Technologists (ITET)
BUET ( Bangladesh University of Engineering & Technology)

Recognition and Achievements 

Bachelor's degrees of AUST are recognized by Bangladesh University of Engineering & Technology (BUET), the leading and one of the oldest universities in the public sector of Bangladesh, for pursuing M.Sc. courses offered by BUET.

The relevant Degrees are also accredited with the Institution of Engineers, Bangladesh (IEB), Institute of Architects, Bangladesh (lAB) and the Institute of Textile Engineers & Technologists, Bangladesh (ITET). AUST has also recently achieved a unique distinction through the approval of the University Grants Commission of Bangladesh (UGC) of its newly constructed spacious campus having modern facilities and infrastructures, as the "Permanent Campus" of AUST.

In 2021, Ahsanullah University of Science and Technology professor Saifur Rahman became the first Institute of Electrical and Electronics Engineers president from South Asia.

On January 2, AUST announced its nanosatellite program and the country's first  2U satellite program for scientific studies. The department of EEE successfully made its mechanical model.

References

External links

 

Architecture schools in Bangladesh
Private engineering universities of Bangladesh
Universities and colleges in Dhaka
Private universities in Bangladesh
Educational institutions established in 1958
Educational institutions established in 1995
1995 establishments in Bangladesh